Michal Bulíř (born August 12, 1991) is a Czech professional ice hockey player. He is currently playing with HC Škoda Plzeň of the Czech Extraliga (ELH).

Bulíř made his Czech Extraliga debut playing with HC Bílí Tygři Liberec during the 2009–10 Czech Extraliga season.

Career statistics

Regular season and playoffs

References

External links

1991 births
Living people
Czech ice hockey forwards
HC Benátky nad Jizerou players
HC Bílí Tygři Liberec players
Sportspeople from Liberec
Metallurg Magnitogorsk players
HC Plzeň players
Czech expatriate ice hockey players in Russia